The Brampton Grange in Brampton, Cambridgeshire, England, is a historic building that dates back to 1773. The building was once vital to the planning and bombing of Germany as the United States Army Air Forces (USAAF) 1st Bombardment Division, part of the Eighth Air Force, was based here from 1943 to 1945, during the Second World War.

The Brampton Grange closed in 2007-2008 after many years of use as a hotel, bar and restaurant.  In November 2015 building work was completed and the building was converted into 11 luxury apartments and marketed by Villager Homes, Brampton.

Brampton's First Girls School
Until the removal of the eastern wing by developers,  marks could be seen on the walls from school girls carvings from their pencils.

Ridley Haim Herschell was asked by Lady Olivia Sparrow to manage her schools in Leigh-on-Sea, Essex and Brampton, Cambridgeshire. The school was at the Grange. Ridley went on to be well known in the religious community.

He was the founder of the British Society for Propagating the Gospel Among the Jews (1842) and of the Evangelical Alliance (1845). It appears that his son was born in Brampton during his time here at the Grange. Farrer Herschell, 1st Baron Herschell (1837-1899), Lord Chancellor, eldest son of the Rev. Ridley Haim Herschell, by Helen Skirving, daughter of William Mowbray of Edinburgh, was born at Brampton on 2 November 1837.

His son later became Lord Chancellor of Great Britain in 1886, and again from 1892 to 1895

USAAF use
RAF Brampton Grange - Station 103 - Brampton, 1st Air Division.

Brampton Grange was the headquarters of the 8th Air Force 1st Bombardment Wing, later renamed the 1st Bombardment Division on 13 September 1943, to end confusion of the term "wing" with the operational combat wings (in December 1944, it was renamed again, becoming the 1st Air Division). From RAF Brampton Grange, as it was termed in official records, the 1st BW/BD/AD directed combat operations of Boeing B-17 Flying Fortress bomber and fighter groups under its command from August 1942, to 25 April 1945. It was an administrative headquarters which relied on RAF Alconbury for logistical support and its flying requirements.

Bomb Groups assigned to the 1st Air Division conducted mercy missions over the German-occupied part of the Netherlands to drop food to starving Dutch in 1945.  Operation Chowhound delivered 4,000 tons of food. On the ground, Dutch teams gathered to distribute it to the starving population, though due to travel difficulties this sometimes took up to ten days.

Though the Germans largely withheld their fire, both operations sustained some losses as three aircraft were lost, two to a collision and a third to an engine fire.

Congressional Visit
Congressmen  Senators Ralph O. Brewster, Henry Cabot Lodge, Jr., Richard Russell, James Mead, and Albert (Happy) Chandler visited the Grange in 1943.

Freedom Of The Borough Of Bedford
On 19 July 1945  Major General Howard M. Turner, Commanding General of the 1st Air Division, was Presented The Freedom Of The Borough Of Bedford.

Post USAAF use
In the spring of 1945 it was taken over by the RAF as the Headquarters of the Technical Training Command. The Grange Hotel opened in 1980.

References

Citations

Bibliography

Buildings and structures in Huntingdonshire
Airfields of the United States Army Air Forces in the United Kingdom